Edward Daniel (born June 13, 1990) is an American professional basketball player for Scafati Basket of the Serie A2 Basket. He played college basketball at Murray State University.

College career
After starring at Woodlawn High School in Birmingham, Daniel committed to play college basketball for the Murray State Racers in Murray, Kentucky and was a key member of the winningest recruiting class in Racer history.  As a junior, Daniel was a starter on the Racers' 2011–12 team, which won 23 straight games to start the season and went 31–2 overall.  As a senior the following year, Daniel averaged a double-double (13.2 points and 10 rebounds per game) and was named first-team All-Ohio Valley Conference.

Professional career
After the close of his college career, Daniel worked out for several NBA teams, but ultimately was not selected in the 2013 NBA draft.  He signed with Pistoia Basket 2000, averaging 8.9 points and 7.5 rebounds for the 2013–14 season.

For the 2014–15 season, Daniel signed with Pallacanestro Varese.  On February 12, 2015, he signed with Vanoli Cremona.

On July 19, 2016, Daniel signed with the Israeli team Maccabi Ashdod.

On July 4, 2017, Daniel signed with French club Champagne Châlons-Reims Basket. He posted 8.9 points and 5.6 rebounds per game in Pro A.

Daniel signed with Rethymno Cretan Kings of the Greek Basket League on August 27, 2018. He was released from the Greek team on September 26, 2018 and subsequently joined Peristeri on a two-month contract. He eventually spent the entire 2018–19 season with the Greek club.

Daniel spent the 2019–20 season in Italy for Fortitudo Bologna, averaging 6.4 points and 3.7 rebounds per game. On July 25, 2020, he signed with Iraklis of the Greek Basket League. On August 5, 2021, he signed with Scafati Basket of the Serie A2 Basket.

References

External links
Italian League profile
Murray State Racers bio

1990 births
Living people
African-American basketball players
American expatriate basketball people in France
American expatriate basketball people in Greece
American expatriate basketball people in Israel
American expatriate basketball people in Italy
American men's basketball players
Basketball players from Birmingham, Alabama
Champagne Châlons-Reims Basket players
Fortitudo Pallacanestro Bologna players
Iraklis Thessaloniki B.C. players
Lega Basket Serie A players
Maccabi Ashdod B.C. players
Murray State Racers men's basketball players
Pallacanestro Varese players
Peristeri B.C. players
Pistoia Basket 2000 players
Power forwards (basketball)
Vanoli Cremona players
21st-century African-American sportspeople